Oakes is a surname of Old English origin, meaning someone who lives by an oak tree or oak wood. It originates from the Old English word 'ac' meaning oak. The first recorded mention of the surname is in Somerset.

Alan Oakes (born 1962), English football player and coach
Alf Oakes (1901–1967), English footballer
Andy Oakes (author) (born 1952), English author
Andy Oakes (footballer) (born 1977), English footballer
Blackford Oakes, fictional protagonist in a series of books by William F. Buckley, Jr.
Bunny Oakes (1898–1970), American football player and coach
Charles Oakes (1861–1928), Australian politician
Charles Oakes (cricketer) (1912–2007), English cricketer
Coralee Oakes (born 1972), Canadian politician
Charles Chandler Oakes (1856–1934), American sea captain
Danny Oakes (1911–2007), American racing driver
David Oakes (born 1983), British actor
Dennis Oakes (born 1946), English cricketer and footballer
Don Oakes (American football) (born 1938), American footballer
Don Oakes (footballer) (1928–1977), English footballer
Edwin Randolph Oakes (1818–1889), Canadian politician
Elizabeth Oakes Smith (1806–1893), American poet, writer, and women's rights activist
Frank L. Oakes (1850–1912), American sea captain
Fred Oakes, English footballer
Gary Oakes (born 1958), British athlete
Geoffrey Oakes (born 1938), English frugby player
George Oakes (Australian politician) (1813–1881), Australian politician
George Oakes (Wisconsin) (1861–1937), American politician
Gordon Oakes (1931–2005), British politician
Sir Harry Oakes, 1st Baronet (1874–1943), British-Canadian entrepreneur
Heather Oakes (born 1959), English athlete
Sir Henry Oakes, 2nd Baronet (1756–1827), British lieutenant-general
Sir Hildebrand Oakes, 1st Baronet (1754–1822), British army Lieutenant-General who served during the American War of Independence
Jack Oakes (1905–1992), English footballer
Jackie Oakes (1919–1995), Scottish footballer
James L. Oakes (1924–2007), American senior circuit judge
Jason Oakes (cricketer) (born 1995), South African cricket player
Jill Oakes (born 1984), American soccer player
Jimmy Oakes (1902–1992), English footballer
John B. Oakes (1913–2001), American journalist
John Cogswell Oakes (1906–1982), US Army Lieutenant General
John Wright Oakes (1820–1887), English landscape painter
Judy Oakes (born 1958), British Olympic athlete
Kaya Oakes, American poet and writer
Keith Oakes (born 1956), English footballer
Laurie Oakes (born 1943), Australian journalist
Lee Oakes (born 1976), English actor
Levi Oakes (1925–2019), American-Canadian Mohawk code talker
Maud Oakes (1903–1990), American ethnologist
Meredith Oakes (born 1946), Australian playwright
Michael Oakes (born 1973), English footballer
Nancy Oakes, American chef
Nigel Oakes (born 1962), British businessman
Oliver Oakes (born 1988), English motor racing driver
Randi Oakes (born 1951), American actress and model
Rebel Oakes (1883–1948), American baseball player
Richard Oakes (activist) (1942–1972), Native American Mohawk activist
Richard Oakes (guitarist) (born 1976), English guitarist for alternative rock band Suede
Royal F. Oakes (born 1952), American radio show host and media legal commentator
Russell J. Oakes (1909–1952), Australian dramatist
Scott Oakes (born 1972), English footballer
Simon Oakes (cricketer) (born 1974), English cricketer
Simon Oakes (executive), English CEO of Hammer Films
Stacy Erwin Oakes (born 1973), American politician
Stefan Oakes (born 1978), English footballer
Thomas Oakes (representative) (1644–1719), American physician and politician
Thomas Oakes (engineer) (died 1823), American engineer
Thomas Fletcher Oakes (1843–1919), American President of the Northern Pacific Railway
Thomas Oakes (footballer) (1874–after 1900), English footballer
Urian Oakes (1631–1681), English-born American minister and President of Harvard College
Warren Oakes (born 1981), American drummer
William Oakes (botanist) (1799–1848), American botanist
William H. Oakes (died 1890), American music publisher

As a given name
Oakes is also less commonly used as a masculine given name. Notable people with the given name Oakes include
Oakes Ames (1804–1873), U.S. Representative from Massachusetts 
Oakes Ames (botanist) (1874–1950), American botanist
Oakes Angier Ames (1829–1899), American businessman and philanthropist 
Oakes Murphy (1849–1908), Governor of the Arizona Territory

See also
Oakes (disambiguation)
Oaks (disambiguation)

References

 Surname Database. "Surname Database - Oakes last name"

Surnames of Old English origin